Macrogastra borealis is a species of air-breathing land snail, a terrestrial pulmonate gastropod mollusk in the family Clausiliidae.

Distribution 
The native distribution of this species is Baltic and Carpathian.

It occurs in the following countries:

 Czech Republic - in Moravia only
 Latvia
 Poland
 Slovakia
 Ukraine

References

Clausiliidae
Gastropods described in 1878